Bencie Woll, FBA, FAAAS (born 1950) is an American–British linguist and scholar of sign language. She became the first professor of sign language in the United Kingdom when she was appointed Professor of Sign Language and Deaf Studies at City University, London in 1995. In 2005, she moved to University College London where she became Professor of Sign Language and Deaf Studies and Director of the Deafness, Cognition and Language Research Centre (DCAL).

Early life and education
Woll was born in 1950 in New York City, United States. She studied at the University of Pennsylvania, where she majored in linguistics and graduated with a Bachelor of Arts (BA) degree in 1970. She then moved to the United Kingdom where she studied theoretical linguistics at the University of Essex, graduating with a Master of Arts (MA) degree in 1971. During her time teaching at the University of Bristol, she studied for a Doctor of Philosophy (PhD) degree in sign language linguistics. She was awarded her doctorate in 1992.

Academic career
Woll's academic research is focused on the linguistics of sign language. She has researched the history and sociolinguistics of British Sign Language (BSL), sociolinguistics of Deaf communities, language development in deaf children, the neuroscience of sign language and developmental and acquired sign language impairments.

From 1973 to 1995, Woll worked at the University of Bristol as a research associate, research fellow, lecturer, and then senior lecturer. In 1995, she was appointed to City University, London, as Professor of Sign Language and Deaf Studies. She thereby became the first person in the United Kingdom to hold a chair in sign language. In August 2005, she moved to University College London (UCL) where she was appointed Professor of Sign Language and Deaf Studies. In 2006, she founded the Deafness Cognition and Language Research Centre at UCL: she served as its director from 2006 to 2016.

Woll offers her services as an expert witness in court cases involving deaf people and British Sign Language. She served as Vice Chair of the Royal Association for Deaf People between 2002 and 2008. Since 2011, she has been a trustee of the UK Council on Deafness.

Honours
Woll was awarded the 2000 BAAL Book Prize for The Linguistics of British Sign Language: An Introduction. In 2012, she was elected a Fellow of the British Academy (FBA), the United Kingdom's national academy for the humanities and social sciences. In 2016, she was elected a Fellow of the American Association for the Advancement of Science.

Selected works

References

1950 births
Living people
Linguists of sign languages
Sociolinguists
Linguists from the United Kingdom
Women linguists
Academics of City, University of London
Academics of University College London
Linguists from the United States
Scientists from New York City
Fellows of the British Academy
Fellows of the American Association for the Advancement of Science
University of Pennsylvania School of Arts and Sciences alumni
Alumni of the University of Essex
Alumni of the University of Bristol
Academics of the University of Bristol
Cognitive linguists